5 MLK is a  17-story mixed-use apartment and office building in Portland, Oregon's Burnside Bridgehead area completed in 2020. It was designed by GREC Architects and built for Gerding Edlen.

Description and history
The building is a full-block five-story podium topped with a twelve-story tower. It went under many rounds of design reviews in 2016 and 2017, A 2016 design showed the tower in "earth tone" panels and glass. Portland architecture blog said it was "design[ed] by committee". The final design was approved in mid-2017. 5 MLK opened in late 2020 offering high-end apartments and commercial spaces. 

The site was previously home to buildings including a three-story quarter-block building constructed in approximately 1912 and historically called the Buckman Building. It was occupied by Fishels Furniture since 1947, which closed in 2016. That building was demolished in early 2018.

References

2020 establishments in Oregon
Apartment buildings in Portland, Oregon
Buckman, Portland, Oregon
Office buildings completed in 2020
Office buildings in Portland, Oregon
Residential buildings completed in 2020